Aadhya Paadam is a 1977 Indian Malayalam-language film, directed by Adoor Bhasi. The film stars Kamal Haasan, Sheela, Sridevi and Jayan. The film has musical score by A. T. Ummer. The film was a remake of Telugu film Evariki Vare Yamuna Theere (1974).

Plot

Cast 

Kamal Haasan
Sridevi
Sheela
Jayan
Sukumari
Jagathy Sreekumar
Adoor Bhasi
Sankaradi
Sreelatha Namboothiri
Raghavan
Paul Vengola
Prathapachandran
Harippad Soman
J. A. R. Anand
K. P. Ummer
Kunchan
Mallika Sukumaran
Meena
Nellikode Bhaskaran
Pala Thankam
Paravoor Bharathan
T. P. Madhavan
Treesa

Soundtrack
The music was composed by A. T. Ummer and the lyrics were written by Sreekumaran Thampi.

Release 

References

External links
 

1977 films
1970s Malayalam-language films
Malayalam remakes of Telugu films
Films scored by A. T. Ummer